Peter Balling (born 5 April 1990) is a Danish handball player for Team Tvis Holstebro and the Danish national team.

He participated at the 2016 European Men's Handball Championship.

References

1986 births
Living people
Danish male handball players
People from Skive Municipality
TTH Holstebro players
Sportspeople from the Central Denmark Region